The Club de la Unión is a gentlemen's club in Santiago, Chile. The name derives from the fact the club united rich men coming together from opposing political parties. Club members met for the first time on July 8, 1864 and its first president was Manuel José Yrarrázaval Larraín.

The club was housed in different locations through downtown Santiago for the first decades. Its current housing was completed in 1925 and was declared a national monument in 1981.

References

Buildings and structures in Santiago
Baroque Revival architecture in Chile